Oszkár Seszták (born 1965) is a Hungarian politician, member of the National Assembly (MP) from Fidesz–KDNP Szabolcs-Szatmár-Bereg County Regional List between 2010 and 2014. He was elected President of the county's General Assembly on 3 April 2008.

References

1965 births
Living people
Fidesz politicians
Christian Democratic People's Party (Hungary) politicians
Members of the National Assembly of Hungary (2010–2014)
People from Borsod-Abaúj-Zemplén County